Flagon and Trencher is a hereditary society composed of men and women who can trace ancestry to one or more licensed operators of an ordinary tavern, inn, public house, or hostel, prior to July 4, 1776, in the area that became the original thirteen U.S. states.  The society has published a number of biographical anthologies, documenting the lives of select colonial taverners.  A record extraction project is underway.  The objective is to eventually identify every colonial taverner for whom evidence survives.

See also 
 Samuel Cole (settler)

External links 
 Flagon and Trencher Official Website

Lineage societies